There are two species of lizard named Texas alligator lizard:
 Gerrhonotus liocephalus
 Gerrhonotus infernalis